Wunderlich may refer to:
 20347 Wunderlich, a main-belt asteroid
 Wunderlich (vacuum tube), vacuum tube radio detector from the early 1930s
 Wunderlich (panels), decorative panels used in Australian architecture, often as ceilings
 Wunderlich Intermediate School, Klein Independent School District, Texas, USA
 Wunderlich Act, a 1954 United States law regarding federal government administration

People with the surname
 Agathon Wunderlich (1810–1878), German jurist
 Alfred Wunderlich (1901–1963), German politician
 Ann Grossman-Wunderlich (born 1970), professional tennis player
 Bernd Wunderlich (figure skater), German figure skater
 Bernd Wunderlich (footballer) (born 1957), German footballer
 Carl Reinhold August Wunderlich (1815–1877), German physician and psychiatrist, internist
 Christian Wunderlich (born 1979), German singer and actor
 Claudia Wunderlich (born 1956), German handball player
 Erhard Wunderlich (1956–2012), German handball player
 Eric Wunderlich (born 1970), American breaststroke swimmer
 Ernst Karl Friedrich Wunderlich (1783–1816), German classical philologist
 Frieda Wunderlich (1884–1965), German female economist and politician (DDP, DStP)
 Friedrich Wunderlich (1891–1977), Fregattenkapitän with the Kriegsmarine during World War II
 Fritz Wunderlich (1930–1966), German tenor singer
 Georg Wunderlich (1893–1963), German footballer
 Hans Wunderlich (1899–1977), German journalist and politician (SPD), MdPR
 Janis Mars Wunderlich, American ceramic artist
 Jerry Wunderlich (1925–1999), American set decorator
 Johann Georg Wunderlich (1755–1819), German composer and flautist
 Jörn Wunderlich (born 1960), a German politician (Die Linke), MdB
 Klaus Wunderlich (1931–1997), German art musician
 Magdalena Wunderlich (born 1952), West German slalom canoer
 Mark Wunderlich, American poet
 Mike Wunderlich (born 1986), German footballer
 Otto Wunderlich (1886–1975), German photographer of Spain
 Paul Wunderlich (1927–2010), German painter
 Pia Wunderlich (born 1975), German female footballer
 Thomas Wunderlich (born 1955), Austrian geodesist
 Tina Wunderlich (born 1977), German female football player

See also
 United States v. Wunderlich, 342 U.S. 98 (1951) was a case decided before the United States Supreme Court
 Wunderlich syndrome, spontaneous, nontraumatic renal hemorrhage
 Wunderlich Verlag, an imprint of the German publishing house Rowohlt Verlag

German-language surnames